The 1976 Tour de Romandie was the 30th edition of the Tour de Romandie cycle race and was held from 4 May to 9 May 1976. The race started in Geneva and finished in Fribourg. The race was won by Johan De Muynck.

General classification

References

1976
Tour de Romandie
Tour de Romandie